Jaroslav Baška (born 5 April 1975 in Považská Bystrica) is a Slovak politician. Baška has served as a member of the National Council in the Direction – Slovak Social Democracy caucus since 2002. In addition, he has been the governor of Trenčín Region since 2013. In 2008-2010, he served as the Minister of Defense.

Early life 
Baška studied electrical engineering at the University of Žilina graduating in 1998. Following the graduation until his entry to politics, he worked at the tire manufacturer Matador.

Political career

National politics 
Baška was first elected to parliament in 2002 and is still a member. Between 2006 and 2010, he was a member of the government, first as a State Secretary at the Ministry of Defense and since 2008 as the Minister of Defense.

Local and regional politics 
In 2003-2006, Baška served as a mayor of the Dohňany village. Since 2013, he has served as the Governor of the Trenčín region.

Personal life 
Baška is married and has three children. He enjoys cycling and often campaigns on his bicycle before elections.

References 

People from Považská Bystrica
Direction – Social Democracy politicians
Defence Ministers of Slovakia
Living people
1975 births
Members of the National Council (Slovakia) 2002-2006
Members of the National Council (Slovakia) 2010-2012
Members of the National Council (Slovakia) 2012-2016
Members of the National Council (Slovakia) 2016-2020
Members of the National Council (Slovakia) 2020-present
21st-century Slovak politicians